Spike Jonze is an American director, screenwriter, producer and actor who has received various awards and nominations, including an Academy Award, two Directors Guild of America Awards, a Golden Globe Award, a Grammy Award, and a Writers Guild of America Award.

Jonze began his feature film directing career with the fantasy comedy film Being John Malkovich (1999), which was met with critical acclaim and earned him nominations for the Academy Award for Best Director and the Directors Guild of America Award for Outstanding Directing for Feature Films. For the comedy-drama metafilm Adaptation. (2002), he was nominated for the Golden Globe Award for Best Director and won the Silver Bear Grand Jury Prize at the Berlin International Film Festival. In 2013, he released the sci-fi romantic comedy film Her, which earned him numerous accolades for his writing, including the Golden Globe Award, the Writers Guild of America Award and the Academy Award for Best Original Screenplay. Jonze was also nominated for Best Picture and Best Original Song at the 86th Academy Awards.

Jonze has directed several music videos, winning the Grammy Award for Fatboy Slim's "Weapon of Choice" (2001), and various commercials for companies like Apple, Adidas or Gap, receiving two Directors Guild of America Awards for Outstanding Directing for Commercials. For his television work, he was nominated for five Primetime Emmy Awards, thanks to his production and writing credits on documentary series like Gaycation (2016–17), Jim & Andy: The Great Beyond (2017) and Beastie Boys Story (2020).

Awards and nominations

Notes

References

External links 
 List of awards and nominations at IMDb

Lists of awards received by film director
Lists of awards received by writer